The A-Class Catamaran, often abbreviated to A-Cat, is a development class sailing catamaran for singlehanded racing.

Background
The class was founded during the late 1950s and was part of the 4-tier IYRU (now World Sailing) approach to divide up the sports catamaran sailing scene into 4 separate groups. These A, B, C and D classes were governed by a very small set of class rules to which each design had to comply. In the beginning it was just:

 Maximum hull length
 Maximum overall width
 Maximum sailarea

All boats designed and built to these specs would be grouped into one fleet and race each other for crossing the finish line first.

The A-Class is the largest remaining of those 4 main classes. The ‘B’ class was a 20 ft twin hander with 235ft2 of sail and developed into the Tornado and a few offshoots such as the F18.  The ‘C’ class was another twin, but at 25 ft with a 300ft2 rig, has become a super sophisticated monster and the pinnacle of small cat design that races for the Little America’s Cup.  The ‘D’ Class was 32 ft and a sail of 500ft2 with three crew, but rapidly dwindled away. As a result, the 'A' class is the smallest, but still maintains its status as the ultimate sailing catamaran single handed design.

Specifications
The official organisation for the A-Class catamaran is the IACA (International A division Catamarans Association).
 
The A-Class rules were expanded over time to prevent the cost of these boats from rising too high and to ensure fairness in racing.

Currently the main A-Class rules are:

Min overall boat weight : 75 kg / 165.3 lbs
Max overall boat length : 5.49 m / 18.3 ft  (= still the old IYRU rule)
Max overall boat width : 2.30 m / 7.5 ft (= still the old IYRU rule)
Max sail area incl. mast : 13.94 m2 / 150.0 ft2 (= still the old IYRU rule)

In handicap racing, the A-Class catamaran uses a Portsmouth Yardstick of 681 in the UK or a D-PN of 64.5 in the USA.

Current situation

The A-Class design has over time converged to a single sail rig using a lightweight carbon mast of about 9 meters length and using lightweight pentex or Kevlar sailcloth. The hulls and beams are often made out of carbon fibre as well, although homebuilt wood or composite materials are still seen on the race circuits. This single sail rig (just a mainsail) allows these boats to truly excel when sailing upwind. Their lightweight and time tested sailing techniques make these boats very fast on reaches and downwind legs as well. They were often unbeatable on the race course and only with the introduction of the asymmetric spinnaker on other catamarans have they lost this position a little bit.

In the decades since their foundation, the A-Class has gathered a significant international following and it has class organisations in many countries around the globe. Their world championships often attracts around 100 boats and sailors. It is also a class that still contains a significant portion of homebuilders, although their numbers are decreasing with every year due to the skills required to make a competitive boat. However, nearly all A-Class sailors tinker with their setups and boats. As it is a developmental class and the rules do allow so much variation, it is paramount that a top sailor keeps experimenting with new setups and generally tries to improve the design even more. Because of this general character of the class, the A-Class is often leading over other catamaran classes in terms of design development. Over time these other classes copy new findings for their own setups. Examples of such developments are: the carbon mast, the squaretop mainsail, the wave-piercer hull design and in general the use of exotic materials.

In 2017 with the advent of practical foiling designs, the IACA divided the class into an Open (Foiling) division, and a non foiling Classic division for boats with straight or C shaped foils, and with different class rules to prevent foiling.  The two have slightly different SCHRS handicaps, the Open being 0.978, the Classic being 1.008.  This allows close racing to continue, and many older boats are still competitive on the Classic circuit particularly.

Builders

Apart from the list below of some of the commercial builders, the A-Class catamaran can be home-built:

 Bimare (Italy) (https://web.archive.org/web/20120823064200/http://www.bimare.org/)
 Aicher-Egner Technologie GmbH (Germany) (http://www.flyer-acat.de/)
 Marstrom (Composite AB Sweden) (http://www.marstrom.com/)
 Scheurer Design & Eng. (Switzerland) (https://web.archive.org/web/20130424015358/http://www.d3-a-cat.com/)
 Scheurer Bootswerft AG (Switzerland) (https://web.archive.org/web/20120705062433/http://www.scheurerwerft.ch/scheurer/)
 VectorWorks Sail (USA)
 Wingfox (Poland) (http://www.wingfox.pl/)
 DNA (Netherlands) (http://dnaperformancesailing.com/)
 Vision (Netherlands) (http://www.catamaranparts.nl/)
 Nikita (Germany)
 Exploder (Poland) (http://www.exploder.info/)

Events

World Championships

Class websites
International A-Division Catamaran Association (IACA) (https://www.a-cat.org)
Australia (http://www.a-cat.org.au/)
Austria (http://www.aaca.at/)
Belgium (http://www.baca.be)
Brazil (https://web.archive.org/web/20131214165019/http://www.abca.esp.br/acat/default_por.asp)
Denmark (http://www.a-cat.dk)
Germany (http://www.a-cat.info)
Great Britain (http://www.a-cat.co.uk)
France (http://www.afcca.org)
Italy (http://www.classeaitalia.it)
New Zealand (http://www.a-class.org.nz)
Netherlands (http://www.a-cat.nl)
Poland (http://www.katamaran.sopot.pl/aklasa.htm)
Sweden (http://www.a-cat.se/)
Switzerland (http://www.saca.ch)
Spain (http://www.adecat.com)
United States of America (http://www.usaca.info/)

See also
 List of multihulls

References

A Class
Catamarans